The territorial defense of Vrhpolje had a military review on 15 April in 1992. There were around 300 soldiers in the review and the commandant of the unit was Arif Hukanovic. In the village of Vrhpolje, a group of Bosniaks didn't want to surrender. They didn't want to surrender their weapons, but they defended their villages. The hodza, Emir Seferovic was captured in a house and he was tortured and later killed.

Battle

14-15 May 
On 14 and 15 May the first clash between the territorial defense of Vrhpolje and the much stronger Army of Republic of Srpska happened. The territorial defense of Vrhpolje offered strong resistance to the enemy force and the enemy forces were forced to withdraw. The enemy suffered casualties and it is assumed that a dozen enemy soldiers were thrown out of the line in that battle.

27 May 
The newly formed Kljuc-Sana battalion under the commandant Amir Avdic blocked the Sanski Most-Kljuc road on the entrance of the village Gornji Ramici. The blockade was done by the Vrhpolje people under the command of Arif and Ifet Hukanovic.

3 June 
The Army of the Republic of Srpska started and attack on the Kljuc-Sana battalion with the goal to destroy the resistance. The whole 6th Sana, Kljuc and Petrovac brigade participated in the attack. One part of the Kljuc-Sana unit with around 150 soldiers was deployed in part of the Galaja forest and the other part with around 50 soldiers held its course in the canyon of the river Sanica. The soldiers which controlled the Galaja forest captured 40 enemy soldiers and 5 officiers. After long negotiations which lasted over 24 hours, they were transported to Bihac and the enemy soldiers were freed. 144 soldiers from Sana and Kljuc entered Bihac and they joined the fighters of Cazinska Krajina.

Legacy 
This victory is celebrated every year in Vrhpolje (Sanski Most). Flowers will be laid on the memorial plaque of Said Karenović in Vrhpolje, and by reciting the fatiha, honor will be paid to this hero who was the first to resist the enemy.

References 

Battles of the Bosnian War